Markus Oehlen (born 1956) is a German visual artist working in painting, sculpture, and music. In the 1970s and 80s he was a founding member of the influential neo-expressionist art movement Neue Wilde in Düsseldorf alongside Martin Kippenberger, Markus Lüpertz, and his brother Albert Oehlen.

References

External links
 https://artfacts.net/artist/markus-oehlen/1609

1956 births
Living people
German contemporary artists
German male painters
20th-century German painters
20th-century German male artists
21st-century German painters
21st-century German male artists